is a Japanese film director and screenwriter.

Life and career
He entered the film industry as an assistant director at Ōkura Pictures (OP Eiga), in which capacity he worked for five years. Takehora's films are generally in a light, erotic-comic vein, and have proven popular with pink film audiences and critics. He was given the Best Director title the following year for Lustful Hitchhiker: Sought Wife (2005), and a four-film career retrospective show at the third annual R18 Love Cinema Showcase held at Tokyo's Theatre Pole-Pole Higashi Nakano in 2006.

Award-winning films

"Ten Best" films, Pink Grand Prix
 2004 9th place: 
 2005 4th place: 
 2005 Honorable Mention: 
 2006 1st place: 
 2006 2nd place: 
 2007 9th place (tie): 
 2008 3rd place: 
 2008 9th place: 
 2009 8th place:

Pinky Ribbon Awards
 2006 Gold Prize:

Bibliography

English

Japanese

References

 
|-
! colspan="3" style="background: #DAA520;" | Pink Grand Prix
|-

|-

Pink film directors
Japanese screenwriters
1974 births
Living people